Programmatic Commerce is the phenomenon where consumers and businesses allow purchase decisions to be made on their behalf by connected devices based on pre-programmed parameters and learned preferences.

It was brought to The Netherlands by Rein Bird.

 This has been driven by the
rise of the Internet of Things and smart devices.

Etymology
The term Programmatic Commerce was coined by ecommerce consultancy Salmon in 2015. The concept was first publicly introduced at the Salmon Commerce 2020 conference, where Neil Stewart, CEO Salmon Ltd. presented the implications of Programmatic Commerce for retail, B2B and branded products.

The term Programmatic Commerce was later Trademarked in the EU on 17 February /2016 by Salmon Ltd.

Definition
Programmatic Commerce loosely refers to the use of technology to make purchasing decision in place of a human. Salmon presented the example of a coffee machine not only detecting when the coffee is running low, but automatically reordering supplies according to an individual’s pre-set preferences. A further example is the tyres on a car detecting when the tread is close to the legal limit, then sending a message to the cars’ manufacturer, enabling them to order replacements in advance.

Through Programmatic Commerce, buying and selling, particularly of routine purchases, will be transformed into an automated process, guided by artificial intelligence and pre-set consumer parameters.

Background
The origins of this shift towards machine-led purchasing may be seen already today, particularly in grocery ecommerce. Online grocery retailers already collect data on consumer purchases, and are able to predict repeat grocery purchases and present these items to consumers in a list when they visit the site. consumers can then accept these suggestions, partly automating the process.

Supported by the increasing prominence of digital technology, the Internet of Things (IoT) and smart technology in everyday life, consumers are already prepared to delegate these less exciting, ‘replenishment’ purchase choices, in the process realising the benefit of the retailer collecting data on them. Programmatic Commerce represents the next step in this process.

Programmatic Commerce depends on one key facilitator: the willingness of the user to allow decision-making to be delegated. This change in consumer behaviour, tied with the advance in connected technology, will transform commerce and marketers must be prepared to respond. The marketing teams that react most quickly to the changing landscape and take advantage of the Internet of Things will be the ones to benefit in the long-run, particularly as brands face the risk of being ‘locked out’. Brands need to build a level of trust so that the “Lock-in” is long term, trust both in terms of what personal data is used but how it is used will be paramount.

Subsequent to Salmon launching the concept, Programmatic Commerce has begun to be more widely used by media to discuss its implications for retail.

Technological context

In 2013 the Global Standards Initiative on Internet of Things (IoT-GSI) defined the IoT as “the infrastructure of the information society.”  The development of this technology has enabled the networking of physical devices, vehicles, buildings and other items with electronics, software, sensors, and network connectivity that enables these objects to collect and exchange data.

When IoT is augmented with sensors and actuators, the technology becomes an instance of the more general class of cyber-physical systems, which also encompasses technologies such as smart grids, smart homes, intelligent transportation and smart cities. Each thing is uniquely identifiable through its embedded computing system but is able to interoperate within the existing Internet infrastructure. Experts predict that in the five-year span between 2015 and 2020, the Internet of Things will grow faster than any other category of connected devices. The number of machine-to-machine connections should grow nearly 2.5-fold, from 4.9 billion in 2015 to 12.2 billion in 2020. By 2020, M2M connections should represent nearly half – 46 percent – of total connected devices.

See also
 eCommerce
 Digital data
 Machine to Machine (M2M)

References

Business terms